Delhi Tourism and Transportation Development Corporation (DTTDC) is an undertaking of the Government of Delhi, India, that was established in December 1975 for the purpose of promoting tourism and related services in the city of Delhi. It has an authorised share capital of Rs. 10.00 crores and a paid up capital of Rs. 6.28 crores. It is involved in several other activities, some of which do not fall under the core activity of promotion of tourism, such as the selling of liquor. This particular activity, however, provides the corporation with revenue that can be utilised in tourism or other related development activities for the National Capital Region of Delhi. The Corporation has Delhi Based firm M/s Rawla & Co. Chartered Accountants as its Statutory Auditors

Main activities
The main activities of Delhi Tourism can be divided into the following heads. yes

Publicity literature
The Corporation promotes tourism whether or not the activities provide any short-term benefits in terms of revenue. The gains from the promotion of these activities are reviewed regularly as part of a longer-term strategy. The use of published literature for publicity and the promotion of tourism is limited to the publication of the following:

Tourism Map of Delhi
Eicher City Guide
CD-ROM on Delhi to provide vital information for the tourist
Annual Calendar and Diary
First Mini Booklet for Distribution in inbound flight

Tourist facilitation
A large number of tourists arrive at the capital of Delhi every year. Activities provided to tourists regarding include:
Package Tours - limited to very few choices, or sometimes to only one destination.
Travel Services - travel services in the form of international air ticketing and foreign exchange banking.
Tourist Transport - taxi services are also provided by the transport division.
Hop-On/Hop-Off Bus service HoHo Delhi, India's first hop-on hop-off bus launched in Oct, 2010. It provides sightseeing service to tourists who are willing to explore Delhi with a more flexible schedule. These tours are conducted in specially designed buses which move continuously along a route, allowing tourists to board or alight at any of the pick up/drop off points. In 2012, two routes were introduced Red and Green. One can opt for one/two day pass. Live Commentary in English and Hindi is also available.

Other tourist activities
The Corporation provides several other activities for tourists. They are:

Garden of Five Senses - a beautiful landscaped park near Saket Metro Station and 2 km from Qutub Minar.
Azad Hind Gram - a rural tourist complex with amphitheatre and a museum in the memory of the freedom fighter Subhas Chandra Bose
four Coffee Homes - run by the Catering Division of DTTDC are located at prime locations in Delhi.
Dilli Haat - a market providing items for sale directly by the craftsmen from different parts of the country at one place, recognised as an art, crafts and cultural centre of Delhi, which was visited by approximately 16 lakhs visitors in 2001. Work on Delhi's second Dilli Haat, in Pitampura, close to Pitampura TV Tower and spread over 3 hectares, began in 2008.
Exhibition and Conference
Musical Fountain - located at Ajmal Khan Park with water cascades synchronised to coloured lights, each show lasts 20 minutes.
Sound and Light show (Son-et-lumiere) - takes place at the Old Fort, Delhi and projects the Fort's history realistically through weekly one-hour shows in Hindi and English covering the history of Delhi over a period of 5000 years. Other activities include boating at nearby lakes and arranging for para-sailing and mountaineering activities in India.

South Extension is an up market shopping area and several global brands are available here.

Chandni Chowk is India’s largest whole sale market and tiny kiosks have brisk sales. It is located in Old Delhi. According to the history of Delhi Shah Jehan had planned the market for his daughter to shop at her will for whatever she wanted.

Dilli Haat is an addition to the magnificence of Delhi where artisans from various corners of India showcase their talent and sell their wares.

Besides the core activity of promotion of tourism, the Corporation directly sells liquor all over Delhi, which is one of the few activities that provides net profit to the corporation. The sale of liquor is carried out through liquor shops, which number over one hundred, and includes the direct selling of Indian Made Foreign Liquor (IMFL) and Country Made Liquor (CL).

The Corporation constructs flyovers as part of the development of infrastructure for easy commuting by tourists in Delhi. The revenue for the construction of some of the flyovers in Delhi has been generated from a share of profit that the Corporation earns from the sale of Country made Liquor (CL). The Corporation charges a flat rate of profit, a margin of Rs.6 per bottle of country liquor, of which a share of Rs.5/- has been fixed as a contribution towards the construction of flyovers. The construction is carried of tourism by transferring knowledge in areas of tour and tourism.

Proposed projects
DTTDC has several projects planned:

Garden of four, ajmal Ajaib, near Saket
Development of Four Dilli Haats.
Water Sports Tourism Complex at Bhaalswa Lake
Establishment of Wayside Amenities at N.H.-8.
Development of a Mini India Heritage Complex
Restoration of denotified monuments
Refurbishment of monuments
Tourist reception centres
Meet and Assist Services
Radio Cabs
Photo Identity Cards .
Illumination of Monuments
Development of Lakes
Use of Information Technology-Helpline/ call center
52 Episode tele-serial on tourism
Handy Audio reach kit
Computer kiosks with WLL phones.

Festivals 
 Qutub Festival
 TAJ MAHAL
 LAL KILA OR RED FORT

References

External links 
 Delhi Tourism website

1975 establishments in Delhi
Transport companies established in 1975
Government agencies established in 1975
Tourism in Delhi
State agencies of Delhi
State tourism development corporations of India
Transport in Delhi